The Taylor River rises close to Castle Peak in Colorado's Elk Mountains in the northeast part of Gunnison County, near the Continental Divide.

Flowing southeast, the river goes through Taylor Park Reservoir, created by the Taylor Park Dam. From there it flows southwest. At Almont, the Taylor River joins with the East River to form the Gunnison River.

Most of the river lies within the Gunnison National Forest. It is a popular river for fly fishing of trout and for whitewater rafting.

See also
List of rivers of Colorado
List of tributaries of the Colorado River

References

External links
 Taylor River rafting agreement 2010. Retrieved 23 January 2011.
 Rafting on the Taylor River video. Retrieved 23 January 2011.

Rivers of Colorado
Rivers of Gunnison County, Colorado
Tributaries of the Colorado River in Colorado